The Netherlands participated in the Eurovision Song Contest 1999 with the song "One Good Reason" written by Tjeerd van Zanen and Alan Michael. The song was performed by Marlayne. The Dutch broadcaster Nederlandse Omroep Stichting (NOS) organised the national final Nationaal Songfestival 1999 in order to select the Dutch entry for the 1999 contest in Jerusalem, Israel. Ten entries competed in the national final on 14 March 1999 where "One Good Reason" performed by Marlayne was selected as the winner following the combination of votes from an eight-member jury panel and a public vote.

The Netherlands competed in the Eurovision Song Contest which took place on 29 May 1999. Performing during the show in position 11, the Netherlands placed eighth out of the 23 participating countries, scoring 71 points.

Background 

The Dutch least successful result has been last place, which they have achieved on four occasions, most recently in the 1968 contest.

The Dutch national broadcaster, Nederlandse Omroep Stichting (NOS), broadcast the event within the Netherlands and organises the selection process for the nation's entry. The Netherlands has used various methods to select the Dutch entry in the past, such as the Nationaal Songfestival, a live televised national final to choose the performer, song or both to compete at Eurovision. However, internal selections have also been held on occasion. In 1998, NOS has organised Nationaal Songfestival in order to select both the artist and song for the contest, a method that was continued for the 1999 Dutch entry.

Before Eurovision

Nationaal Songfestival 1999 
Nationaal Songfestival 1999 was the national final developed by NOS that selected the Dutch entry for the Eurovision Song Contest 1999. Ten entries competed in the competition that consisted of a final on 14 March 1999 which took place at the Studio 22 in Hilversum, hosted by Paul de Leeuw and Linda de Mol and was broadcast on TV2. The first part of the national final was watched by 1.9 million viewers in the Netherlands, while the second part was watched by 1.4 million viewers.

Competing entries 
227 submissions were received by the Dutch broadcaster following a submission period and ten competing entries were selected. Five of the entries for the competition came from the public submission which occurred through the decision by a selection commission led by Willem van Beusekom, while the remaining five entries came from composers directly invited by NOS.

Final 
The final took place on 14 March 1999 where ten entries competed. The winner, "One Good Reason" performed by Marlayne, was selected by the 50/50 combination of a public televote and the votes of an eight-member expert jury. The viewers and the juries each had a total of 408 points to award. Each juror distributed their points as follows: 1, 2, 3, 4, 5, 6, 8, 10 and 12 points. The viewer vote was based on the percentage of votes each song achieved. For example, if a song gained 10% of the vote, then that entry would be awarded 10% of 408 points rounded to the nearest integer: 41 points. In addition to the performances of the competing entries, the show featured 1998 British Eurovision entrant Imaani performing her song "Where Are You?".

Criticism 
As a result of the modified rules for the 1999 contest that allowed participants to perform in any language, a majority of the submitted songs for the national final were in English and the ten selected songs were all performed in English as well. Democrats 66 member Boris Dittrich claimed that "the Dutch language and identity has lost out to commercial considerations" and called on NOS as well as the Dutch State Secretary to influence the submission of Dutch songs in the following years. NOS spokesperson Fred de Vries later explained that language and commercial considerations were not part of the selection criteria for the commission which only chose the finalists based on quality.

At Eurovision
According to Eurovision rules, all nations with the exceptions of the bottom seven countries in the 1998 contest competed in the final on 29 May 1999. On 17 November 1998, a special allocation draw was held which determined the running order and the Netherlands was set to perform in position 11, following the entry from France and before the entry from Poland. The Netherlands finished in eighth place with 71 points.

The show was broadcast in the Netherlands on TV2 with commentary by Willem van Beusekom. The Dutch spokesperson, who announced the Dutch votes during the show, was 1998 Dutch Eurovision entrant Edsilia Rombley.

Voting
Below is a breakdown of points awarded to the Netherlands and awarded by the Netherlands in the contest. The nation awarded its 12 points to the Germany in the contest.

References

1999
Countries in the Eurovision Song Contest 1999
Eurovision